Jo Yong-suk (born September 5, 1988) is a North Korean sport shooter. She represents the Amnokgang National Defense Sports Team.

Jo was is from Sariwon, North Hwanghae, but now lives in Pyongyang.

At the 2012 Summer Olympics, she competed in the Women's 10 metre air pistol and achieved 10th position out of 49 athletes.  She also competed in the 25 metre pistol, finishing in 7th.  She competed in the same events at the 2016 Olympics, finishing in 12th in the 10 metre air pistol and 7th in the 25 metre pistol.

References

North Korean female sport shooters
Living people
Olympic shooters of North Korea
Shooters at the 2008 Summer Olympics
Shooters at the 2012 Summer Olympics
Shooters at the 2016 Summer Olympics
Asian Games medalists in shooting
Shooters at the 2010 Asian Games
1988 births
Asian Games gold medalists for North Korea
Asian Games bronze medalists for North Korea
Medalists at the 2010 Asian Games
21st-century North Korean women